Gordon College may refer to:

 Gordon College (Georgia), a public college in Barnesville, Georgia
 Gordon College (Massachusetts), a Christian college in Wenham, Massachusetts
 Government Gordon College, a Christian college in Rawalpindi, Pakistan
 Gordon College (Philippines), a public university in Olongapo City, Zambales
 Gordon College of Education, a college in Haifa, Israel
 Gordon Memorial College, Khartoum, Sudan